Winthrop Pickard Bell (May 12, 1884 – April 4, 1965) was a Canadian academic who taught philosophy at the University of Toronto and Harvard. He is however perhaps best known for his work as a historian of Nova Scotia.

Biography
He was born in Halifax, Nova Scotia and educated at Mount Allison University, McGill University, Harvard University (where he studied under Josiah Royce, about whose theory of knowledge he was later to write his doctoral dissertation), the University of Leipzig, and finally at the University of Göttingen (where he completed his doctoral studies under Edmund Husserl).

Edith Stein was among his friends during his Göttingen period.

During the First World War he was held in the civilian internment camp at Ruhleben, near Berlin, for more than three years. After the war he taught philosophy at the University of Toronto and at Harvard University, which he left in 1927 to pursue a career in business.

In his latter years he focused his energies on historical research, much of which concerned the group of mid-18th-Century immigrants to Nova Scotia known as the "Foreign Protestants". His most notable publication was The "Foreign Protestants" and the Settlement of Nova Scotia, which was published by the University of Toronto Press in 1961; his Register of the Foreign Protestants of Nova Scotia was published some years after his death.

References

External links
 Mount Allison University Archives Website Concerning Winthrop Pickard Bell
 Publications of Winthrop Pickard Bell
 Mount Allison University Archives: Winthrop Pickard Bell fonds
 Nova Scotia Archives: Winthrop Pickard Bell Fonds
 The Foreign Protestants
 Register of the Foreign Protestants of Nova Scotia

Mount Allison University alumni
Harvard University alumni
University of Göttingen alumni
World War I civilian detainees held by Germany
Academic staff of the University of Toronto
Harvard University faculty
1884 births
1965 deaths
McGill University alumni